The Tejon Indian Tribe of California is a federally recognized tribe of Kitanemuk,  Yokuts, and Chumash indigenous people of California.

Their ancestral homeland is the southern San Joaquin Valley, San Emigdio Mountains, and Tehachapi Mountains. Today they live in Kern County, California.

Government
The tribe's headquarters are located in Bakersfield, California. They are governed by a democratically–elected tribal council.  their tribal chairperson is Octavio Escobedo III and their vice-chairwoman is June Nachor.

History 
The Sebastian Indian Reservation (1853-1864) was established in 1853 by Edward F. Beale on Rancho El Tejon lands, that became part of the Tejon Ranch. It was the first Indian reservation in California. Two thousand Indians lived on the land. In 1863 Beale purchased Rancho El Tejon for his private use. One hundred Indians stayed on his lands when the reservation was dissolved. Many Indians were forcibly relocated at gunpoint to the new Tule River reservation, which was established near Porterville in Tulare County.

The tribe received approval to acquire  of land in Mettler from the Department of the Interior along with the department's approval of the compact between the tribe and California that will govern class three gaming on the land.

Notes

External links
Official government website of the Tejon Indian Tribe of California

Federally recognized tribes in the United States
Native American tribes in California
Chumash
Yokuts
Kern County, California
San Emigdio Mountains
San Joaquin Valley
Tehachapi Mountains
Mountain Communities of the Tejon Pass